Carl Kölling (28 February 1831  3 May 1914) was a German composer of piano music.

Two works available for the intermediate piano student are (Lose Blätter) Flying Leaves in C Major, Op. 147, No. 1 and Fluttering Leaves in A Minor, Op. 147, No. 2 found in Masterpieces with Flair published by Alfred Publishing Company, Inc.

Hungary (Rapsodie Mignonne),  Op. 410, is in Your Favorite Solos for Piano compiled and edited by George Walter Anthony from Th. Presser.

References

External links
 
 

1831 births
1914 deaths
German composers
19th-century German musicians